Love Crazy, also released as Madly in Love in some markets, is a Canadian romantic comedy film, directed by Robert Ménard and released in 1991.

Synopsis 
A 40-year-old ad man, Rémy (Rémy Girard), meets a former lover, Sarah (Nathalie Gascon), and finds himself head-over-heels in love with her all over again. Sarah's husband (Jean Rochefort) is philosophical and figures she will soon tire of the affair. However, Rémy's wife's (Danielle Proulx) reaction is somewhat different. She throws him out, begs him to come back, takes a lover of her own and then slumps into a deep depression.

Cast
 Rémy Girard as Rémy
 Jean Rochefort as Rudolph
 Nathalie Gascon as Sarah
 Danielle Proulx as Judith
 Jessica Barker as Corinne
 Gilles Renaud as Rick
 Caroline St-Onge as Etudiante
 Jocelyn Bérubé as Préposé au stationnement
 Geneviève L'Allier-Matteau as Zira
 Jean-Louis Millette as Gérant de l'immeuble

Awards
The film garnered six Genie Award nominations at the 12th Genie Awards in 1991:
 Best Actor: Rémy Girard, Jean Rochefort
 Best Supporting Actress: Danielle Proulx
 Best Original Screenplay: Claire Wojas
 Best Original Score: Marie Bernard
 Best Original Song: Rémy Girard and Claire Wojas, "C'est plus fort que nous"
Girard and Proulx won their awards.

References

External links
 
 

1991 films
1991 romantic comedy films
Canadian romantic comedy films
Films directed by Robert Ménard
French-language Canadian films
1990s Canadian films